Iván Marcano Sierra (born 23 June 1987) is a Spanish professional footballer who plays for Portuguese club FC Porto. Mainly a central defender, he can also play as a left-back. 

After starting out at Racing de Santander and appearing for the club in La Liga, he went on to spend the better part of his career with Porto, playing over 200 competitive matches and winning the 2017–18, 2019–20 and 2021–22 Primeira Liga championships. He also had spells abroad in Greece (Olympiacos, twice), Russia and Italy.

Marcano represented Spain at under-21 level.

Club career

Racing
Santander-born Marcano, a youth graduate of hometown's Racing de Santander, made his first appearance with the main squad in an away win over UD Almería on 30 September 2007, due to injuries in the Cantabrian side. However, he had to leave the pitch in the second half of the game, also due to injury, and was unable to play for three months.

For the 2008–09 campaign, Marcano was definitely promoted to the first team under new manager Juan Ramón López Muñiz. He scored his first La Liga goal in the fifth match, a 2–1 home loss against RCD Mallorca, and was a regular throughout the campaign, mostly as a left-back.

Villarreal
Marcano signed a six-year deal with Villarreal CF in early July 2009. He was first-choice for most of the first part of his first season; however, after consecutive poor performances, he fell out of favour, even losing his position in the defensive pecking order to 19-year-old Argentine Mateo Musacchio (originally signed for the B side). His one goal was on 4 May 2010 in a 4–2 loss at UD Almería.

Deemed surplus to requirements at Villarreal for 2010–11, Marcano was loaned to Getafe CF on 8 June 2010. Benefitting from injuries to both Mario and Rafa, he was regularly used in both defensive positions as the Madrid outskirts team narrowly avoided relegation; he netted his only goal of the season on 24 October 2010, in a 3–0 home win against Sporting de Gijón. The following 20 February on Racing's visit to the Coliseum Alfonso Pérez, he was sent off for a foul on Giovani dos Santos from which Pablo Pinillos scored the only goal from the penalty spot with three minutes remaining.

Olympiacos and Rubin
On 2 June 2012, after one season with Olympiacos F.C. in Greece, where he playing alongside several compatriots – including manager Ernesto Valverde – and was essential in the double conquest, Marcano was sold by Villarreal to FC Rubin Kazan in the Russian Premier League, for about €5 million. On 14 July he made his debut in the Super Cup as a second-half substitute in a 2–0 win over FC Zenit Saint Petersburg, with his team being captained by compatriot defender César Navas. He played 11 times in a run to the UEFA Europa League quarter-finals, and headed a goal in a 3–2 home win over Chelsea on 11 April though the English club advanced 5–4 on aggregate.

In the 2014 winter transfer window, Marcano returned to his previous club on loan until June and with the option to subsequently make the deal permanent.

Porto
Marcano signed a four-year contract with FC Porto on 11 August 2014, replacing Manchester City-bound Eliaquim Mangala. He became the sixth Spaniard to join the Portuguese club after compatriot Julen Lopetegui took over three months earlier.

On 21 April 2015, Marcano was sent off for a second yellow card as Porto lost 6–1 away to FC Bayern Munich in the quarter-finals of the UEFA Champions League, being eliminated from the tournament despite having won the first leg. In his third season he scored four goals – five in all competitions– but his team could only finish third.

On 6 November 2016, after several occasions on which he wore the armband after the titular was replaced, Marcano acted as captain for the first time as a starter, in a 1–1 home draw against S.L. Benfica. He scored his first Champions League goal on 17 October 2017, closing the 3–2 group-stage away defeat to RB Leipzig just before half-time. In addition, he netted a career-best five times in the domestic league in the 2017–18 campaign, which ended with the conquest of the Primeira Liga championship after five years.

Roma
Marcano moved to the Italian Serie A on 31 May 2018, with the 30-year-old agreeing to a three-year deal at A.S. Roma. He made his league debut on 31 August, playing the first half of the 2–1 away loss to A.C. Milan.

During his spell at the Stadio Olimpico, Marcano appeared in only 13 competitive matches, with Federico Fazio, Kostas Manolas and Juan Jesus playing more frequently in central defence. He scored his only goal in the last 16 of the Coppa Italia in a 4–0 home win over Virtus Entella of Serie C on 14 January 2019.

Return to Porto
Marcano returned to former club Porto on 11 July 2019, again being given the number 5 jersey and signing a four-year contract. He contributed five goals in the first season in his second spell, winning another domestic league.

Marcano spent the better part of the 2020–21 campaign on the sidelines, nursing an anterior cruciate ligament injury. He made a comeback in late February, playing for the reserve team in Liga Portugal 2, but after two games he was ruled out again with a muscular injury.

Following a foot operation in November 2021, Marcano did not return until the 2022 Supertaça Cândido de Oliveira, playing in the 3–0 win over C.D. Tondela on 30 July in place of suspended new signing David Carmo. The following 28 January, he scored to conclude a 2–0 win over Sporting CP in the Taça da Liga final.

International career
Marcano was part of Juan Ramón López Caro's squad for the 2009 UEFA European Under-21 Championship in Sweden. He featured in the 2–0 win over Finland, in an eventual group stage exit.

Personal life
Marcano's older brother, Alejandro (born 1983), was also a footballer. A goalkeeper, he competed solely in the lower leagues.

Career statistics

Honours
Olympiacos
Super League Greece: 2011–12, 2013–14
Greek Football Cup: 2011–12

Rubin Kazan
Russian Super Cup: 2012

Porto
Primeira Liga: 2017–18, 2019–20, 2021–22
Taça de Portugal: 2019–20, 2021–22
Taça da Liga: 2022–23
Supertaça Cândido de Oliveira: 2022

Notes

References

External links

1987 births
Living people
Spanish footballers
Footballers from Santander, Spain
Association football defenders
La Liga players
Segunda División B players
Tercera División players
Rayo Cantabria players
Racing de Santander players
Villarreal CF players
Getafe CF footballers
Super League Greece players
Olympiacos F.C. players
Russian Premier League players
FC Rubin Kazan players
Primeira Liga players
Liga Portugal 2 players
FC Porto players
FC Porto B players
Serie A players
A.S. Roma players
Spain under-21 international footballers
Spanish expatriate footballers
Expatriate footballers in Greece
Expatriate footballers in Russia
Expatriate footballers in Portugal
Expatriate footballers in Italy
Spanish expatriate sportspeople in Greece
Spanish expatriate sportspeople in Russia
Spanish expatriate sportspeople in Portugal
Spanish expatriate sportspeople in Italy